Ioannis Kokkodis (born 8 January 1981) is a retired Greek swimmer who won a bronze medal in the 4 × 200 m freestyle relay at the 2002 European Aquatics Championships. He also competed in the 2000, 2004 and 2008 Summer Olympics with the best achievement of sixth place in the 400 m medley in 2004, in his native city of Athens. This was the first Olympics in more than 100 years where Greek swimmers reached the finals.

References

1981 births
Living people
Greek male swimmers
Swimmers at the 2000 Summer Olympics
Swimmers at the 2004 Summer Olympics
Swimmers at the 2008 Summer Olympics
Olympic swimmers of Greece
European Aquatics Championships medalists in swimming
Mediterranean Games bronze medalists for Greece
Mediterranean Games medalists in swimming
Swimmers at the 2001 Mediterranean Games
Greek male freestyle swimmers
Swimmers from Athens